Ali Asgar Lobi is a Bangladesh Nationalist Party politician and a former member of parliament for Khulna-2. He is also a former president of the Bangladesh Cricket Board.

Career
Lobi was elected to parliament in a 2001 by-election for Khulna-2 as a candidate of Bangladesh Nationalist Party. The seat had been won by Khaleda Zia, Bangladesh Nationalist Party chairperson, in the 2001 general election. She resigned from the seat, having won multiple seats but only being able to occupy one, leading to the by-election. Lobi owned Hawa Bhaban, the political office of Khaleda Zia. He served as the president of the Bangladesh Cricket Board from 2001 to 2006. From 2002 to 2004 he served as the president of the Asian Cricket Council.

Corruption
In October 2007, Lobi was sentenced to 13 years imprisonment for corruption by a special court in Bangladesh. He was jailed for amassing illegal wealth worth up to Tk. 204 million (US$3.5 million) and concealing his income. Lobi was also fined Tk. 1 million and had his illegal property confiscated. Earlier in July of the same year, he was sentenced to 8 years jail for evading taxes of US$2.4 million. His wife, Khusnar Asgar, was also jailed for 3 years for aiding him in his corruption.

References

Bangladesh Nationalist Party politicians
Living people
8th Jatiya Sangsad members
Year of birth missing (living people)
People from Khulna District